The Hum Goes on Forever is the seventh studio album by American rock band the Wonder Years. It was released on September 23, 2022, by the Loneliest Place on Earth and Hopeless Records.

Style and composition 
The band originally planned to begin writing their next album after the conclusion of their 2020 tour, but the COVID-19 pandemic meant that they did not see each other for several months. They struggled to write virtually, and the record was not created until the band quarantined in a Pennsylvania farmhouse for a week. Many songs on The Hum Goes On Forever reference previous tracks from the Wonder Years' discography: the protagonist of "Oldest Daughter" is named after the titular character in "Madelyn" from The Greatest Generation, while "Cardinals II" is a sequel to the track on No Closer to Heaven.

Recording and production 
Steve Evetts, who frequently collaborated with the Wonder Years, produced most of the album, while Will Yip also produced certain tracks, which were initially intended for a standalone EP preceding the album. During production the band decided to combine the results of both sessions. Recording took place at The Omen Room, Studio 606, and Studio 4.

Release and promotion 
On April 21, 2022, the Wonder Years released "Oldest Daughter", their first single since Sister Cities was released four years prior and the lead single for a then-untitled album. On May 19, they released "Summer Clothes" as a follow-up single. On June 22, the band announced that The Hum Goes on Forever would be released on September 23 via Hopeless Records. Accompanying the album announcement, which included cover art and a track listing, they released the single "Wyatt's Song (Your Name)".

In October 2022, the Wonder Years headlined a small East Coast tour to promote The Hum Goes On Forever. They were supported by Fireworks and Macseal.

Track listing

Personnel 

The Wonder Years
 Matt Brasch – rhythm guitar, vocals
 Dan Campbell – lead vocals
 Casey Cavaliere – lead guitar
 Mike Kennedy – drums
 Josh Martin – bass, vocals
 Nick Steinborn – guitar, keyboards

Technical
 Steve Evetts – production (1–4, 8–12)
 Will Yip – production (5–7)
 Andy Clarke – engineer (1–4, 8–12)
 Vince Ratti – mixing
 Ryan Smith – mastering
 Oliver Roman – additional engineering (1–4, 8–12)
 Evan Myaskovsky – additional engineering (1–4, 8–12)
 Jerred Polacci – additional engineering (1–4, 8–12)
 Justin Bartlett – additional engineering (5–7)
 Jordan Ly – additional engineering (5–7)
 John Carpineta – additional engineering (5–7)

Charts

References 

2022 albums
The Wonder Years (band) albums
Hopeless Records albums
Albums produced by Steve Evetts
Albums produced by Will Yip